Charles Quinlivan (1924–1974) was a film and television actor in the United States in the 1950s, 1960s, and 1970s, best known as the star of the western movie Seven Guns to Mesa, and of the short-lived 1960 TV series Mr. Garlund.

Personal life
Charles Quinlivan was born September 30, 1924, in Jersey City, New Jersey.  He married Evelyn Byrd Jervey, and had a daughter, Byrd, who is a physician, and a son, Charles, who is still active in the production side of the film industry.  Charles Quinlivan died of a heart attack November 12, 1974 in Fountain Valley, California.

Filmography

Film career
 Zero Hour! (1957) - Harry Burdick
 Seven Guns to Mesa (1958) - John Trey
 All the Young Men (1960) - Lt. Earl D. Toland
 Banning (1967) - Hob Davish (uncredited)
 Airport 1975 (1974) - Dan Vesper - Passenger (uncredited)

Television career
 Schlitz Playhouse of Stars (1957), in One Way Out - Kirkwood
 Goodyear Theatre (1958), in The White Flag - Larsen
 Cheyenne (1958), in Noose at Noon - Jim O'Neil
 Highway Patrol (1959), in 'Confession Sea Hunt (1960), in Hot Cargo - Colonel Korvin
 Mr. Garlund (1960), (6 episodes) - Frank Garlund
 The Barbara Stanwyck Show (1961), in The Cornerstone - Detective Thomas Kelly
 Lock-Up (1961), in The Intruder - Don Nichols
 Hawaii Five-O (1973), in Engaged to Be Buried - Carson
 Emergency! (1974), in Details'' - Driver (final appearance)

References

External links
 

1924 births
1974 deaths
American male film actors
American male television actors
20th-century American male actors